Fearing Pond, also erroneously named on some maps as Fearings Pond (pronounced to rhyme with bearing), is a  natural kettlehole pond in Plymouth, Massachusetts. It is located in the southern section of Myles Standish State Forest, north of Charge Pond, northwest of Abner Pond, west of Fawn Pond, south of College Pond, southeast of East Head Reservoir, and east of the forest headquarters. However there is no  direct access as the bridge over the Wankinco River connecting Cranberry Road in Carver and Fearing Pond Road in Plymouth was washed out several years ago. The bridge has not been rebuilt.

Camp Cachalot and Camp Squanto are nearby. The pond is fed by groundwater. A public beach is located on the southeast side of the pond and on the northern side of the pond is where boating access is available. Summer cottages and campsites line the perimeter of the pond. The pond is usually stocked by MassWildlife

References

External links
MassWildlife – Pond Maps

Ponds of Plymouth, Massachusetts
Ponds of Massachusetts